The "" ("Song of Germany"), officially titled "" ("The Song of the Germans"), has been the national anthem of Germany either wholly or in part since 1922, except for a seven-year gap following World War II in West Germany. In East Germany, the national anthem was "Auferstanden aus Ruinen" ("Risen from Ruins") between 1949 and 1990. 

Since World War II and the fall of Nazi Germany, only the third stanza has been used as the national anthem. Its incipit "" ("Unity and Justice and Freedom") is considered the unofficial national motto of Germany, and is inscribed on modern German Army belt buckles and the rims of some German coins.

The music is the hymn "Gott erhalte Franz den Kaiser", written in 1797 by the Austrian composer Joseph Haydn as an anthem for the birthday of Francis II, Emperor of the Holy Roman Empire and later of Austria. In 1841, the German linguist and poet August Heinrich Hoffmann von Fallersleben wrote the lyrics of "" as a new text for that music, counterposing the national unification of Germany to the eulogy of a monarch: lyrics that were considered revolutionary at the time.

The "" was adopted as the national anthem of Germany in 1922, during the Weimar Republic, to which all three stanzas were used. West Germany retained it as its official national anthem in 1952, with only the third stanza sung on official occasions. After German reunification in 1990, in 1991 only the third stanza was reconfirmed as the national anthem. It is discouraged, although not illegal, to perform the first stanza (or to some degree, the second), due to association with the Nazi regime or previous nationalist sentiment.

Title
The "" is also well known by the incipit and refrain of the first stanza, "" ("Germany, Germany above all"), but this has never been its title. This line originally meant that the most important aim of 19th-century German liberal revolutionaries should be a unified Germany which would overcome loyalties to the local kingdoms, principalities, duchies and palatines (Kleinstaaterei) of then-fragmented Germany. Only later, and especially in Nazi Germany, did these words come to imply German superiority over and domination of other countries.

Melody 

The melody of the "", also known as “the Austria tune”, was written by Joseph Haydn in 1797 to provide music to the poem "Gott erhalte Franz den Kaiser" ("God save Francis the Emperor") by Lorenz Leopold Haschka. The song was a birthday anthem honouring Francis II (1768–1835), Habsburg emperor, and was intended as a parallel to Great Britain's "God Save the King". Haydn's work is sometimes called the "Emperor's Hymn" (Kaiserhymne). It was the music of the National Anthem of Austria-Hungary until the abolition of the Habsburg Monarchy in 1918. It is often used as the musical basis for the hymn "Glorious Things of Thee Are Spoken".

It has been conjectured that Haydn took the first four measures of the melody from a Croatian folk song. This hypothesis has never achieved unanimous agreement; an alternative theory reverses the direction of transmission, positing that Haydn's melody was adapted as a folk tune. For further discussion, see Haydn and folk music. 

Haydn later used the hymn as the basis for the second movement (Poco adagio cantabile) of his String Quartet No. 62 in C major, Opus 76 No. 3, often called the "Emperor" or "Kaiser" quartet.

Historical background 

The Holy Roman Empire, stemming from the Middle Ages, was already disintegrating when the French Revolution and the ensuing Napoleonic Wars altered the political map of Central Europe. However, hopes for human rights and republican government after Napoleon's defeat in 1815 were dashed when the Congress of Vienna reinstated many small German principalities. In addition, with the Carlsbad Decrees of 1819, Austrian Chancellor Klemens von Metternich and his secret police enforced censorship, mainly in universities, to keep a watch on the activities of teachers and students, whom he held responsible for the spread of radical liberalist ideas. Since reactionaries among the monarchs were the main adversaries, demands for freedom of the press and other liberal rights were most often uttered in connection with the demand for a united Germany, even though many revolutionaries-to-be held differing opinions over whether a republic or a constitutional monarchy would be the best solution for Germany.

The German Confederation (Deutscher Bund, 1815–1866) was a federation of 35 monarchical states and four republican free cities, with a Federal Assembly in Frankfurt. The federation was essentially a military alliance, but it was also abused by the larger powers to oppress liberal and national movements. Another federation, the German Customs Union (Zollverein) was formed among the majority of the states in 1834. In 1840 Hoffmann wrote a song about the Zollverein, also to Haydn's melody, in which he ironically praised the free trade of German goods which brought Germans and Germany closer.

After the 1848 March Revolution, the German Confederation handed over its authority to the Frankfurt Parliament. For a short period in the late 1840s, Germany was united with the borders described in the anthem, and a democratic constitution was being drafted, and with the black-red-gold flag representing it. However, after 1849, the two largest German monarchies, Prussia and Austria, put an end to this liberal movement towards national unification.

Hoffmann's lyrics 

August Heinrich Hoffmann von Fallersleben wrote the text in 1841 while on holiday on the North Sea island Heligoland, then a possession of the United Kingdom (now part of Germany).

Hoffmann von Fallersleben intended "" to be sung to Haydn's tune; the first publication of the poem included the music. The first line, "" (usually translated into English as "Germany, Germany above all, above all in the world"), was an appeal to the various German monarchs to give the creation of a united Germany a higher priority than the independence of their small states. In the third stanza, with a call for "" (unity and justice and freedom), Hoffmann expressed his desire for a united and free Germany where the rule of law, not arbitrary monarchy, would prevail.

In the era after the Congress of Vienna, influenced by Metternich and his secret police, Hoffmann's text had a distinctly revolutionary and at the same time liberal connotation, since the appeal for a united Germany was most often made in connection with demands for freedom of the press and other civil rights. Its implication that loyalty to a larger Germany should replace loyalty to one's local sovereign was then a revolutionary idea.

The year after he wrote "Das Deutschlandlied", Hoffmann lost his job as a librarian and professor in Breslau, Prussia (now Wrocław, Poland) because of this and other revolutionary works, and was forced into hiding until he was pardoned following the revolutions of 1848 in the German states.

Lyrics 
Only the third stanza (marked in bold) is used as the modern German national anthem.

Use before 1922 
The melody of the "Deutschlandlied" was originally written by Joseph Haydn in 1797 to provide music to the poem "Gott erhalte Franz den Kaiser" ("God save Franz the Emperor") by Lorenz Leopold Haschka. The song was a birthday anthem to Francis II, Holy Roman Emperor of the House of Habsburg, and was intended to rival in merit the British "God Save the King". 

After the dissolution of the Holy Roman Empire in 1806, "" became the official anthem of the emperor of the Austrian Empire. After the death of Francis II new lyrics were composed in 1854, Gott erhalte, Gott beschütze, that mentioned the Emperor, but not by name. With those new lyrics, the song continued to be the anthem of Imperial Austria and later of Austria-Hungary. Austrian monarchists continued to use this anthem after 1918 in the hope of restoring the monarchy. The adoption of the Austrian anthem's melody by Germany in 1922 was not opposed by Austria.

"" was not played at an official ceremony until Germany and the United Kingdom had agreed on the Heligoland–Zanzibar Treaty in 1890, when it appeared only appropriate to sing it at the ceremony on the now officially German island of Heligoland. During the time of the German Empire it became one of the most widely known patriotic songs.

The song became very popular after the 1914 Battle of Langemarck during World War I, when, supposedly, several German regiments, consisting mostly of students no older than 20, attacked the British lines on the Western front while singing the song, suffering heavy casualties. They are buried in the Langemark German war cemetery in Belgium.

Official adoption 
The melody used by the "Deutschlandlied" was still in use as the anthem of the Austro-Hungarian Empire until its demise in 1918. On 11 August 1922, German President Friedrich Ebert, a Social Democrat, made the "Deutschlandlied" the official German national anthem. In 1919 the black, red and gold tricolour, the colours of the 19th century liberal revolutionaries advocated by the political left and centre, was adopted (rather than the previous black, white and red of Imperial Germany). Thus, in a political trade-off, the conservative right was granted a nationalistic composition, although Ebert continued to advocate the use of the third stanza only (as after World War II). 

During the Nazi era, only the first stanza was used, followed by the SA song "Horst-Wessel-Lied". It was played at occasions of great national significance, such as the opening of the 1936 Summer Olympics in Berlin, when Hitler and his entourage, along with Olympic officials, walked into the stadium amid a chorus of three thousand Germans singing "". In this way, the first stanza became closely identified with the Nazi regime.

Use after World War II 
After its founding in 1949, West Germany did not have a national anthem for official events for some years, despite a growing need for one for the purpose of diplomatic procedures. In lieu of an official national anthem, popular German songs such as the "Trizonesien-Song", a self-deprecating carnival song, were used at some sporting events. A variety of musical compositions was used or discussed, such as the finale of Ludwig van Beethoven's Ninth Symphony, which is a musical setting of Friedrich Schiller's poem "An die Freude" ("Ode to Joy"). Though the black, red and gold colours of the national flag had been incorporated into Article 22 of the (West) German constitution, no national anthem had been specified. On 29 April 1952, Chancellor Konrad Adenauer asked President Theodor Heuss in a letter to accept "" as the national anthem, with only the third stanza to be sung on official occasions. However, the first and second stanzas were not outlawed, contrary to popular belief. President Heuss agreed to this on 2 May 1952. This exchange of letters was published in the Bulletin of the Federal Government. Since it was viewed as the traditional right of the President as head of state to set the symbols of the state, the "" thus became the national anthem.

Meanwhile, East Germany had adopted its own national anthem, "Auferstanden aus Ruinen" ("Risen from Ruins"). As the lyrics of this anthem called for "Germany, united Fatherland", they were no longer officially used from approximately 1972 onwards, when East Germany abandoned its goal of uniting Germany under communism. By design, with slight adaptations, the lyrics of "" can be sung to the melody of the "" and vice versa. 

In the 1970s and 1980s, efforts were made by conservatives in Germany to reclaim all three stanzas for the national anthem. The Christian Democratic Union of Baden-Württemberg, for instance, attempted twice (in 1985 and 1986) to require German high school students to study all three stanzas, and in 1989, CDU politician Christean Wagner decreed that all high school students in Hesse were to memorise the three stanzas.

On 7 March 1990, months before reunification, the Federal Constitutional Court declared only the third stanza of Hoffmann's poem to be legally protected as a national anthem under German criminal law; Section 90a of the Criminal Code (Strafgesetzbuch) makes defamation of the national anthem a crime, but does not specify what the national anthem is. This did not mean that stanzas one and two were no longer part of the national anthem, but that their peculiar status as "part of the [national] anthem but unsung" disqualified them for penal law protection, since the penal law must be interpreted in the narrowest manner possible. 

In November 1991, President Richard von Weizsäcker and Chancellor Helmut Kohl agreed in an exchange of letters to declare the third stanza alone to be the national anthem of the reunified republic. Hence, as of then, the national anthem of Germany is unmistakably the third stanza of the "Deutschlandlied", and only this stanza, set to Haydn's music. 

The incipit of the third stanza, "" ("Unity and Justice and Freedom"), is widely considered to be the national motto of Germany, although it has never been officially proclaimed as such. It appears on Bundeswehr soldiers' belt buckles (replacing the earlier "Gott mit uns" ("God with Us") of the Imperial German Army and the Nazi-era Wehrmacht) and on 2 euro coins minted in Germany, and on the edges of the obsolete 2 and 5 Deutsche Mark coins.

Criticisms

Geographical

The first stanza, which is no longer part of the national anthem and is not sung on official occasions, names three rivers and one strait – the Meuse (Maas in German), Adige (Etsch) and Neman (Memel) Rivers and the Little Belt strait – as natural boundaries of the German Sprachbund. The song was written before German unification, and there was no intention to delineate borders of Germany as a nation-state. Nevertheless, these geographical references have been variously criticised as irredentist or misleading. Today, no part of any of these four natural boundaries lies in Germany. The Meuse and the Adige were parts of the German Confederation when the song was composed, and were no longer part of the German Reich as of 1871; the Little Belt strait and the Neman became German boundaries later (the Belt until 1920, and the Neman between 1920 and 1939). 

None of these natural boundaries formed a distinct ethnic border. The Duchy of Schleswig (to which the Belt refers) was inhabited by both Germans and Danes, with the Danes forming a clear majority near the strait. Around the Adige there was a mix of German, Venetian and Gallo-Italian speakers, and the area around the Neman was not homogeneously German, but also accommodated Prussian Lithuanians. The Meuse (if taken as referencing the Duchy of Limburg, nominally part of the German Confederation for 28 years due to the political consequences of the Belgian Revolution) was ethnically Dutch, with few Germans. 

Nevertheless, such nationalistic rhetoric was relatively common in 19th-century public discourse. For example, Georg Herwegh in his poem "The German Fleet" (1841) gives the Germans as the people "between the Po and the Sund" (Øresund), and in 1832 Philipp Jakob Siebenpfeiffer, a noted journalist, declared at the Hambach Festival that he considered all "between the Alps and the North Sea" to be Deutschtum (the ethnic and spiritual German community).

Textual
The anthem has frequently been criticised for its generally nationalistic tone, the immodest geographic definition of Germany given in the first stanza, and an alleged male-chauvinistic attitude in the second stanza. A relatively early critic was Friedrich Nietzsche, who called the grandiose claim in the first stanza "" (the most idiotic slogan in the world), and in Thus Spoke Zarathustra said, " – I fear that was the end of German philosophy." The pacifist Kurt Tucholsky was another critic, who published in 1929 a photo book sarcastically titled Deutschland, Deutschland über alles, criticising right-wing groups in Germany.

However, for propaganda purposes, the latter translation was endorsed by the Allies during World War I.

Modern use of the first stanza 
As the first stanza of the "Deutschlandlied" is historically associated with the Nazi regime and its crimes, the singing of the first stanza is considered taboo within modern German society. Although the first stanza is not forbidden within Germany based on the German legal system, any mention of the first stanza is considered to be incorrect, inaccurate, and improper during official settings and functions, within Germany or abroad. 

In 1977, the German pop singer Heino produced a record of the song which included all three stanzas for use in primary schools in Baden-Württemberg. The inclusion of the first two stanzas was met with criticism at the time. 

In 2009, the English rock musician Pete Doherty sang "Deutschlandlied" live on radio at Bayerischer Rundfunk in Munich with all three stanzas. As he sang the first stanza, he was booed by the audience. Three days later, Doherty's spokesperson declared that the singer was "not aware of the historical background and regrets the misunderstanding". A spokesperson for Bayerischer Rundfunk welcomed the apology, noting that further cooperation with Doherty would not have been possible otherwise. 

When the first stanza was played as the German national anthem at the canoe sprint world championships in Hungary in August 2011, German athletes were reportedly "appalled". Eurosport, under the headline of "Nazi anthem", erroneously reported that "the first stanza of the piece [had been] banned in 1952."

Similarly, in 2017, the first stanza was mistakenly sung by Will Kimble, an American soloist, during the welcome ceremony of the Fed Cup tennis match between Andrea Petkovic (Germany) and Alison Riske (U.S.) at the Center Court in Lahaina, Hawaii. In an attempt to drown out the soloist, German tennis players and fans began to sing the third stanza instead.

Variants and additions

Additional or alternative stanzas 
Hoffmann von Fallersleben also intended the text to be used as a drinking song; the second stanza's toast to German wine, women and song is typical of this genre. The original Heligoland manuscript included a variant ending of the third stanza for such occasions: 

An alternative version called "" (Children's Hymn) was written by Bertolt Brecht shortly after his return from exile in the U.S. to a war-ravaged, bankrupt and geographically shrunken Germany at the end of World War II, and set to music by Hanns Eisler in the same year. It gained some currency after the 1990 unification of Germany, with a number of prominent Germans calling for his "antihymn" to be made official: 

In the English version of this "antihymn", the second stanza refers ambiguously to "people" and "other folk", but the German version is more specific: the author encourages Germans to find ways to relieve the people of other nations from needing to flinch at the memory of things Germans have done in the past, so that people of other nations can feel ready to shake hands with a German again as they would with anyone else.

Notable performances and recordings 
The German musician Nico sometimes performed the national anthem at concerts and dedicated it to militant Andreas Baader, leader of the Red Army Faction. She included a version of "" on her 1974 album The End.... In 2006, the Slovenian industrial band Laibach incorporated Hoffmann's lyrics in a song titled "Germania", on the album Volk, which contains fourteen songs with adaptations of national anthems.

Influences 

The German composer Max Reger quotes the "Deutschlandlied" in the final section of his collection of organ pieces Sieben Stücke, Op. 145, composed in 1915–16 when it was a patriotic song but not yet the national anthem. 

An Afrikaans patriotic song, "Afrikaners Landgenote", has been written with an identical melody and similarly-structured lyrics to the "Deutschlandlied". The lyrics of this song consist of three stanzas, the first of which sets the boundaries of the Afrikaans homeland with the means of geographical areas, the second of which states the importance of "Afrikaans mothers, daughters, sun, and field", recalling the "German women, loyalty, wine, and song", and the third of which describes the importance of unity, justice, and freedom, along with love.

Notes

References 

Sources

External links 

 Die Nationalhymne der Bundesrepublik Deutschland, German Federal Government 
 "Das Lied der Deutschen", ingeb.org
 "Das Lied der Deutschen" at Brandenburg Historica
 
 , during the official German Unity Day ceremony on 3 October 1990
 

German-language songs
1922 establishments in Germany
German anthems
Weimar Republic
West Germany
National anthems
Songs about Germany
Songs based on poems
National anthem compositions in E-flat major
1841 songs